Forbidden Women (aliases: Nisa Muharramat , translit.Nesaa Moharramat or Nessa Muharramat) is a 1959 Egyptian drama film directed by Mahmoud Zulfikar. It is written by Amin Youssef Ghorab and Mahmoud Zulfikar. The film stars Salah Zulfikar, Huda Sultan.

Plot 
Tawfiq is a wealthy man who works as a contractor. He was married to Hafiza and they did not have any children, so he adopts Ahmed, who manages his business later. Ahmed became involved in an affair with a playful woman named Mahasin. By chance, Tawfiq meets Mahasen through one of the matchmakers. The situation gets worse when Mahasen becomes pregnant with Ahmed at the same time which he desires her daughter, Laila, without knowing that she is Mahasen's daughter.

Crew 

 Writer: Amin Youssef Ghorab
 Screenwriter: Mahmoud Zulfikar
 Director: Mahmoud Zulfikar
 Produced by: Union Films (Abbas Helmy)
 Distribution: Al Sharq Film Distribution Company
 Soundtrack: Andre Ryder
 Cinematographer: Mohamed Abdel Azim, Adel Abdel Azim
 Editor: Albert Naguib

Cast 

 Salah Zulfikar as Ahmed
 Huda Sultan as Mahasin
 Amina Rizk as Hafida
 Hussein Riad as Tawfiq
 Amaal Farid as Lily
 Widad Hamdi as Zakia
 Hussein Aser as Salem Effendi
 Fifi Saeed as Halima
 Mohsen Hassanein
 Hussein Ismail

See also 

 Salah Zulfikar filmography
 List of Egyptian films of 1959
 List of Egyptian films of the 1950s

References

External links 

 

Egyptian black-and-white films
1959 films
1959 drama films
Egyptian drama films
1950s Arabic-language films